N. Sundaram is an Indian politician and was a Member of the Legislative Assembly of Tamil Nadu. He was elected to the Tamil Nadu Legislative Assembly as a Tamil Maanila Congress (Moopanar) candidate from Karaikudi constituency in 1996 election and as an Indian National Congress candidate in the 2006 elections.

References 

Indian National Congress politicians from Tamil Nadu
Living people
Tamil Maanila Congress politicians
Tamil Nadu MLAs 1996–2001
Tamil Nadu MLAs 2006–2011
Year of birth missing (living people)